Isoda (written: 礒田) is a Japanese surname. Notable people with the surname include:

, Japanese filmmaker, music producer and educator
, Japanese swimmer
, Japanese synchronized swimmer
, Japanese footballer

See also
6463 Isoda, a main-belt asteroid

Japanese-language surnames